Marcia Lewis (August 18, 1938 – December 21, 2010) was an American character actress and singer. She was nominated twice for the Tony Award as Best Featured Actress in a Musical (Chicago and Grease) and twice for the Drama Desk Award for Outstanding Featured Actress in a Musical (Chicago and Rags).

Life and career
Lewis was born in Melrose, Massachusetts and raised in Cincinnati, Ohio.  She was a registered nurse at the University of Cincinnati Hospital and Mount Sinai Hospital (Manhattan) and received her RN from the Jewish Hospital School of Nursing in Cincinnati in 1959.

Stage and Television
Lewis made her Broadway debut in the original production of Hello, Dolly!, taking over the role of Ernestina.  Additional theater credits include The Time of Your Life (1969), Annie, taking over the role of Miss Hannigan in April 1981, Rags (1986) (nominee, Drama Desk Award, Outstanding Featured Actress in a Musical), Roza (1987), Orpheus Descending  with Vanessa Redgrave (1989), and the 1990 revival of Fiddler on the Roof as Golde. Lewis appeared in the 1994 revival of Grease as Miss Lynch, and was nominated for the Tony Award, Best Featured Actress in a Musical.  She appeared as the Matron in the 1996 revival of Chicago. For her work, she received nominations for the Tony Award, Best Featured Actress in a Musical and Drama Desk Award, Outstanding Featured Actress in a Musical.

She appeared at the Off-Broadway Theatre of the Zanies in An Impudent Wolf (1965), the Players Theatre in Who's Who Baby? (1968), and Playwrights Horizons in Romance Language in 1984 and When She Danced in 1990.

Lewis toured in Cabaret as Fraulein Schneider and appeared in Chicago at the Mandalay Bay hotel in Las Vegas, Nevada, for three months. Her television credits include guest appearances on The Bob Newhart Show (1975), Baretta (1975), The Bionic Woman (1976), Happy Days (1977, 1979), the TV movie When She Was Bad (1979) and Kate and Allie (1988).

Performing and Personal Life
As a singer, Lewis performed in most of the leading cabarets and supper clubs in Manhattan, including Rainbow & Stars, Upstairs at the Duplex, Upstairs at the Downstairs, Grande Finale, Reno Sweeney's, Freddy's Eighty-Eights, Town Hall, The Village Gate, and the Russian Tea Room. Lewis also appeared in concert at Carnegie Hall.

Lewis' solo album Nowadays (1998), a collection of showtunes and standards recorded with the Mark Hummel Quartet, is available on the Original Cast Records label.

Lewis married her second husband on June 24, 2001; Fred D. Bryan was a Nashville financial adviser. Lewis died on December 21, 2010, at her home in Brentwood, Tennessee, of cancer, aged 72. After that her body was cremated. Bryan survives her.

References

External links
 Official website
 
 
 

1938 births
2010 deaths
Deaths from cancer in Tennessee
American women singers
American stage actresses
American television actresses
American musical theatre actresses
Actresses from Cincinnati
People from Melrose, Massachusetts
People from Brentwood, Tennessee
21st-century American women